Bonda is a locality of Guwahati surrounded by the locality of Narengi, India.

Transportation
Bonda is connected to the rest of the city via the bus lines and other modes of transportation.

References

Neighbourhoods in Guwahati